Pierrick Cros may refer to:
Pierrick Cros (footballer, born 1991), French football goalkeeper
Pierrick Cros (footballer, born 1992), French football defender